Jenny Mensing (born 26 February 1986) is a German swimmer from Berlin. She has received several medals at European Championships. At the 2016 Summer Olympics in Rio de Janeiro, she competed in the women's 200 metre backstroke. She finished in 16th place in the semifinals and did not qualify for the final. She was a member of the 4 x 100 metre medley relay team which finished 12th in the heats and did not qualify for the final.

Outside her sports career, Mensing works as a police officer, currently holding the rank of Polizeikommissar (police inspector).

References

External links
 
 
 
 

1986 births
Living people
German female swimmers
Olympic swimmers of Germany
Swimmers at the 2012 Summer Olympics
Swimmers at the 2016 Summer Olympics
European Aquatics Championships medalists in swimming
Swimmers from Berlin
German female backstroke swimmers
20th-century German women
21st-century German women